Union Township is one of eleven townships in Howard County, Indiana, United States. As of the 2010 census, its population was 1,029 and it contained 419 housing units.

History
Union Township was organized in 1853.

Geography

Unincorporated towns
 Jerome
 Phlox
 West Liberty
(This list is based on USGS data and may include former settlements.)

Adjacent townships
 Jackson Township (north)
 Sims Township, Grant County (northeast)
 Green Township, Grant County (east)
 Wildcat Township, Tipton County (south)
 Taylor Township (west)
 Liberty Township (northwest)

Cemeteries
The township contains three cemeteries: Jerome, New Hope and Union Civil.

Major highways

Airports and landing strips
 Hall Airport
 Howard County Airport

References
 U.S. Board on Geographic Names (GNIS)
 United States Census Bureau cartographic boundary files

External links
 Indiana Township Association
 United Township Association of Indiana

Townships in Howard County, Indiana
Kokomo, Indiana metropolitan area
Townships in Indiana